Don Ienner is an American music executive. He served as president of Columbia Records from 1989 to 2003, and as Chairman from 1994 to 2003. In April 2003 he became president of Columbia's umbrella company, Sony Music U.S., overseeing its music labels, and was named Chief Executive Officer of Sony Music Label Group, U.S. in 2004. He resigned from that position on June 1, 2006.

As of 2012, Ienner was a music business consultant, a principal in an advertising agency, and the founder and owner of several restaurants in Naples, Florida.

Career

Early career
In 1969, Ienner began his career in the music industry by taking a job in the mailroom of Capitol Records. From 1972 to 1977, Ienner and his brother Jimmy Ienner ran a music production, management, and publishing company called C.A.M. U.S.A., which worked with such artists as Three Dog Night, Grand Funk Railroad, Blood, Sweat & Tears, and Eric Carmen. While producing a record for Blood, Sweat & Tears, Ienner met Clive Davis, then head of Columbia.

In 1977, he co-founded Millennium Records with his brother Jimmy Ienner, serving as executive president.

Arista Records
Ienner joined Arista Records in 1983 as vice president of promotion. In 1988, then-president Clive Davis appointed Ienner to executive vice president and general manager. Ienner became particularly well known for this promotion and marketing of Whitney Houston, who had a historic seven consecutive #1 Billboard Hot 100 hits during the 1980s.

Other notable promotional activity included a commentary in Billboard magazine Ienner authored in 1988 which initiated the “When You Play It, Say It” campaign. The campaign urged radio stations to identify the artist’s name before or after a song was played, a growing problem for all record companies.

Columbia Records & Sony Music
In 1989, at the age of 36, Ienner was named president of Columbia Records, the youngest executive ever to head the record label. At the time Columbia, which had been bought by Japanese Sony Corp. in November 1987, was losing market share. The label was also seen as falling behind the times.

Ienner led Columbia in the signing of alternative groups Alice in Chains and Toad the Wet Sprocket and brought on Jermaine Dupri’s So So Def Recordings and Chris Schwartz’s Ruffhouse Records, which carried The Fugees and Cypress Hill.

In 1994, Ienner was promoted to chairman of Columbia Records (while retaining his title as president), which he held until 2003. In seven of the 13 years that he served as president—the longest tenure of anyone to hold that title—Columbia was the No. 1 record label.

In 2003, Ienner was named chairman of Sony Music U.S., overseeing all of Sony’s music labels, including Columbia, Epic, Sony Music Nashville, and Sony Urban Music. In his new capacity, Ienner oversaw the revitalization of the company’s Nashville labels by signing new artists Gretchen Wilson and Miranda Lambert.

In a 2017 interview with Howard Stern, the singer-songwriter John Mellencamp strongly implied that he left Columbia Records because of racist remarks Ienner made about the background vocalist on Mellencamp's 2001 single "Peaceful World." The British singer George Michael claimed to have overheard Ienner referring to him as a "faggot," triggering the singer's 1994 legal effort to dissolve his contract with Columbia. (Michael lost the case and Ienner denied using the term.)

References

Sony people
American music industry executives
Living people
Year of birth missing (living people)